Jorge Cilley (1914–1960), nicknamed La Chinche was an Argentine rugby union flanker who played for both, Club Atlético San Isidro (CASI) and San Isidro Club (SIC). He also was four times capped for the Argentina national team.

Career 
Cilley began his career in Club Atlético San Isidro, where he won the Torneo de la URBA titles of 1933 and 1934. Cilley was one of the founding members of San Isidro Club, team where he won two URBA titles fin 1939 and 1941.

On August 16, 1936, Cilley had his first test match against Great Britain. He participates in the first tour outside the country of the Argentina national team. On September 20, 1936, in Valparaíso, Argentina played against the national team of Chile, with a score 29–0 in favor of Argentina.

Titles

Gallery

References

External links 
 www.rugbytime.com

1914 births
1960 deaths
Argentine people of English descent
Argentine people of Spanish descent
Rugby union players from Buenos Aires
Argentina international rugby union players
Argentine rugby union players
San Isidro Club rugby union players
Rugby union flankers